Feroze Gandhi College, also spelled as Firoz Gandhi College is a college in Raebareli, Uttar Pradesh, established on 8 August 1960 by then local Member of Parliament Feroze Gandhi. It is associated with University of Lucknow.

About
Feroze Gandhi College is the main center for higher education in the Raebareli district. The college was established on 8 August 1960 by the then Member of Parliament Sri Feroze Gandhi. At present the college is providing education in four faculties namely "Science, Arts, Commerce & Education". There is also a proposal to declare it A Deemed University.

Notable alumni
Manoj Kumar Pandey, MLA
Akhilesh Kumar Singh, former MLA
Ram Singh Patel, former MLA

See also
Feroze Gandhi
Rajiv Gandhi National Aviation University

References

External links
 

Universities and colleges in Raebareli